Gary E. Hicks (born November 30, 1953) is the Senior Associate Justice of the New Hampshire Supreme Court. He was sworn in January 31, 2006.

Hicks obtained his degree in mathematics from Bucknell University in 1975.  He is a 1978 graduate of Boston University School of Law

Before being sworn in to the New Hampshire Supreme Court, Hicks worked for Wiggin & Nourie for 23 years. He is  the former chairman of the American Inns of Court Leadership Council, and the American Inns Nomination Committee.

Hicks was presented with the 2021 Civil Justice Award by the New Hampshire Access to Justice Commission.

References

1953 births
20th-century American lawyers
21st-century American judges
Boston University School of Law alumni
Bucknell University alumni
Living people
New Hampshire lawyers
New Hampshire state court judges
Justices of the New Hampshire Supreme Court
Place of birth missing (living people)
21st-century American politicians